Point de chute (English titles: Stumbling Point, Falling Point) is a 1970 French film, directed by Robert Hossein and starring Johnny Hallyday.

Cast 
 Johnny Hallyday – Vlad, "Le Roumain" ("The Romanian")
 Pascale Rivault – Catherine
 Robert Hossein – the boss
 Robert Dalban – the inspector
 Albert Minski – Eddy
 Philippe Pelletier – a schoolboy
 Christian Barbier

References

External links 
 
  (INA archive)

1970s French-language films
French drama films
1970 films
1970 drama films
Films directed by Robert Hossein
1970s French films